Charles Jay McWilliams (June 7, 1915 – October 17, 2010) was an American college basketball coach. A graduate of Penn State University, McWilliams was head coach of the Virginia Military Institute, Trinity College, and Alfred University during his twenty-year coaching career.

Coaching career
McWilliams began coaching in 1945 at the Virginia Military Institute in Lexington, Virginia. At VMI, he led the Keydets basketball team to a 1–10 season, his only one with the school. This ranks him 27th (last) at VMI in total wins and 26th in terms of winning percentage.

After returning to school in Springfield, Massachusetts for a year, McWilliams picked up coaching again at Alfred University, in Allegany County, New York. He spent ten seasons at the school, and compiled a 78–96 record with the Saxons. Following his time at Alfred, McWilliams joined Trinity College in Connecticut, where he was head basketball coach from 1957 to 1965, as well as an assistant football. McWilliams' 66–60 record at Trinity make him third all-time in school history in wins as well as winning percentage.

After his twenty-year career in collegiate athletics, McWilliams became the director of physical education for Hudson City Public Schools in Hudson, Ohio. He became the city's first director of recreation. McWilliams was also tennis coach at Ashland University after retirement.

Personal life
McWilliams attended Penn State University where he earned his Bachelor of Science in 1937. At Penn State McWilliams starred on the basketball team. He later earned a master's degree in process engineering from Springfield College in 1947. McWilliams briefly served in World War II as an athletic and recreation officer.

McWilliams died on October 17, 2010, in his hometown of Willoughby, Ohio. He preceded in death his wife, Natalie, and his three children, Kathryn, Peter, and Barbara.

Head coaching record

References

1915 births
2010 deaths
Alfred Saxons men's basketball coaches
American men's basketball players
Basketball coaches from Ohio
Basketball players from Ohio
Penn State Nittany Lions basketball players
People from Hudson, Ohio
People from Willoughby, Ohio
Springfield College (Massachusetts) alumni
Trinity Bantams men's basketball coaches
Trinity Bantams football coaches
VMI Keydets basketball coaches